Tafadzwa Kamungozi (born 8 June 1987) is a Zimbabwean cricketer who bowls leg break. He has been picked in the Zimbabwean squad for the 2006 Champions Trophy without having played any One-day Internationals before, though he did play for a Zimbabwe Board XI in a three-match series against an Australian Academy team which was lost 0–3. Kamungozi played three official List A matches for Masvingo in the 2005–06 one-day league in Zimbabwe, taking five wickets, of which four came in a game against Mashonaland who were bowled out for 76.

He made his Test match debut for Zimbabwe  against Bangladesh on 25 October 2014.

Tour of South Africa
Kamungozi made his debut for the senior Zimbabwe side in a Twenty20 tour match on the 2006–07 tour of South Africa against Eagles, where he scored one run from two balls at No. 11 and bowled four overs for 27, thus being the most economical of Zimbabwe's bowlers in the nine-wicket loss. He also played in the third and final One-day International of the series, conceding 70 runs off his 10 overs as South Africa racked up 418 for five and Zimbabwe lost by 171 runs.

References

External links
 
 Masvingo set up title decider with Matabeleland, from Cricinfo, retrieved 11 September 2006
 Player Profile: Tafadzwa Kamungozi from CricketArchive
 Eagles v Zimbabweans, from Cricinfo, retrieved 13 September 2006

1987 births
Living people
Zimbabwean cricketers
Zimbabwe One Day International cricketers
Zimbabwe Twenty20 International cricketers
Zimbabwe Test cricketers
Masvingo cricketers
Centrals cricketers
Cricketers at the 2015 Cricket World Cup